Muzeum Geologiczne Instytutu Nauk Geologicznych PAN w Krakowie is a museum in Kraków, Poland. The collection dates back to 1865.

External links
 

Museums in Kraków
Geology museums in Poland
Natural history museums in Poland